Gibbibarbus cyphotergous is a species of ray-finned fish in the family Cyprinidae.
It is found only in China.

Sources

 

Cyprinid fish of Asia
Freshwater fish of China
Fish described in 1988
Taxonomy articles created by Polbot
Taxobox binomials not recognized by IUCN